Schanz is a German surname. Notable people with the surname include:

Martin Schanz (1842–1914), German classicist 
Georg von Schanz (1853–1931), German legal scholar
Charley Schanz (1919–1992), American baseball player
Waldemar Schanz (born 1968), German sport shooter
(Linda) Heidi Schanze (born 1973), American actress

See also
Aachen Schanz station, a railway station in Aachen
Schanz Glacier, a glacier in the Heritage Range
Schantz

German-language surnames